Wolfgang Schopf (born 23 June 1983) is an Austrian luger who has competed since 2000. A natural track luger, he won two gold medals in the men's doubles event at the FIL World Luge Natural Track Championships (2001, 2003).

Schopf also won two medals at the FIL European Luge Natural Track Championships with a gold in 2002 and a bronze in 2004.

References
FIL-Luge profile
Natural track European Championships results 1970-2006.
Natural track World Championships results: 1979-2007

External links
 

1983 births
Living people
Austrian male lugers